Endymion primarily refers to:
 Endymion (mythology), an Ancient Greek shepherd 
 Endymion (poem), by John Keats

Endymion may also refer to:

Fictional characters
 Prince  Endymion, a character in the Sailor Moon anime franchise
 Raul Endymion, a character in the Hyperion Cantos series of science fiction novels
 Endymion, a deity for Dark Elves in Dungeons & Dragons; see Elf (Dungeons & Dragons)
 A Certain Magical Index: The Movie – The Miracle of Endymion, a 2013 Japanese animated film
 "Endymion, the Master Magician", a card in the Yu-Gi-Oh! Trading Card Game and a character in Yu-Gi-Oh! 5D's World Championship 2009: Stardust Accelerator.

People
 Endymion Porter, an English diplomat and royalist
 Endymion Wilkinson, a diplomat, Sinologist and historian
 Endymion Smythe, 3rd Viscount Strangford
 Krewe of Endymion, a New Orleans Mardi Gras krewe

Titled works

 "Endymion", a poem by Henry Wadsworth Longfellow
 "Endymion", a poem by Oscar Wilde
 Endymion, a painting by George Frederic Watts
 Endymion (Disraeli novel), an 1880 novel by Benjamin Disraeli, 1st Earl of Beaconsfield
 Endymion (Simmons novel), a 1996 science fiction novel
 The Rise of Endymion, a sequel to the above novel
 Endymion (play), by John Lyly
 Endymion, a sculpture by Antonio Canova

Science and technology
 342 Endymion, an asteroid 
 Endymion, in botany a synonym of the bluebell genus Hyacinthoides
 Turanana endymion, the binomial Latin name for the odd-spot blue butterfly
 Endymion (crater), on the Moon
 HMS Endymion, any of four British warships 
 USS Endymion (ARL-9)
 Endymion (yacht)
 Endymion, an Armstrong Whitworth Ensign aircraft

Music
 Endymion (band), a Dutch Hardcore trio (on Netherlands Wikipedia)
 Endymion (ensemble), an English chamber music group

See also
 Endy Sleep, a Canadian direct online-only mattress retailer named after the mythological figure
 Endymion Penhaligon's parfum produced since 2003